Gerald Meale (born Robert Gerald James Meale on 18 December 1947, in Hammersmith, Middlesex) was an English cricketer. He was a right-handed batsman and wicket-keeper who played for Wiltshire.

Having appeared for the team in the Minor Counties Championship since 1974, Meale made two List A appearances for the team, the first in 1983 and the second a season later, in his final year playing for the team.

In the only innings in which he batted, he scored 19 runs, the second highest score of the Wiltshire team.

External links
Gerald Meale at Cricket Archive 

1947 births
Living people
English cricketers
Wiltshire cricketers
People from Hammersmith